is a Japanese footballer currently playing as a defender for Thespakusatsu Gunma.

Career statistics

Club
.

Notes

References

External links

1999 births
Living people
Association football people from Miyazaki Prefecture
Kanagawa University alumni
Japanese footballers
Association football defenders
J2 League players
Fagiano Okayama players
Thespakusatsu Gunma players